Étienne Victor Tréfeu (de Tréval) (born Saint-Lô, Manche, September 25, 1821 – died Paris, June, 1903), was a French librettist, song writer and theatre manager. He is best known for his work with Jacques Offenbach. He originally came to prominence as a writer of popular songs. In 1873 he became the administrator of the Théâtre de la Gaîté in Paris.

Works 
1855: Le Rêve d'une nuit d'été, saynète in 1 act by Jacques Offenbach
1857: Croquefer, ou Le dernier des paladins, opérette bouffe en 1 act by Jacques Offenbach, libretto with Adolphe Jaime fils
1859: Geneviève de Brabant, opéra bouffon in 2 acts by Jacques Offenbach, libretto by Étienne Tréfeu and Adolphe Jaime fils 
1863: Il Signor Fagotto, one-act opéra comique by Jacques Offenbach, libretto by Charles Nuitter and Étienne Tréfeu 
1864: Le soldat magicien, one-act opéra comique by Jacques Offenbach, libretto by Charles Nuitter and Étienne Tréfeu 
1864: Jeanne qui pleure et Jean qui rit, opérette en 1 acte de Jacques Offenbach, libretto by Charles Nuitter and Étienne Tréfeu 
1865: Coscoletto ou le Lazzarone, two-act opéra comique by Jacques Offenbach, libretto by Charles Nuitter and Étienne Tréfeu 
1869: La princesse de Trébizonde, opéra bouffe in 2 then 3 acts by Jacques Offenbach, libretto by Charles Nuitter and Étienne Tréfeu 
1869: La Romance de la rose, one-act operetta by Jacques Offenbach, libretto by Étienne Tréfeu and Jules Prével 
1871: Boule-de-Neige, three-act opéra bouffe by Jacques Offenbach, libretto by Charles Nuitter and Étienne Tréfeu 
1874: Whittington, grand-opéra-bouffe-féerie in 3 acts by Jacques Offenbach, libretto by Charles Nuitter and Étienne Tréfeu adapted in English by Henry Brougham Farnie

Bibliography 
Tréfeu (de Tréval), Etienne (Victor) by Andrew Lamb, in 'The New Grove Dictionary of Opera', ed. Stanley Sadie (London, 1992) 

fILS DE jEAN trefeu le CHOUESNES de FREVAL 1788 St Pierre de Semilly (50) - D.1869 Saint Lô (50)
marié à Lasténie Reine de TOCQUEVILLE, fille de Jean Hubert de TOCQUEVILLE et de Anne Adélaïde Sophie DUBOSC Née Vers 1781 Honfleur (14)elle-même fille de Louis Nicolas Adrien DUBOSC  - cafetier, né 1734 Grandchain (27) marié à GUERARD Catherine Françoise 1785 Condé S/Vire - D. 1861 Saint lô (50) (Pts: Branche GUERARD Gille 1700-1786 Condé S/Vire (50) et THOMINE Anne 1702-1758 Ste Suzanne (50Manche)

External links 
 Étienne Tréfeu on Wikisource
 Étienne Tréfeu on data.bnf.fr

People from Saint-Lô
1821 births
1903 deaths
French opera librettists
French male dramatists and playwrights
19th-century French dramatists and playwrights
19th-century French male writers